Mallazai or Malazai is a settlement in the Quetta District of the province of Balochistan, Pakistan. It is situated close to the N-25 National Highway between the city of Quetta and Kuchlak.

See also
 Quetta
Malazai (disambiguation)

References

Populated places in Balochistan